Fünf auf der nach oben offenen Richterskala is the fourth full-length studio album by the German experimental rock band Einstürzende Neubauten, released in 1987 through Some Bizzare Records in the U.K. and What's So Funny About GmbH in Germany. It was reissued in 2002 through the band's own label, Potomak.

Reception 

Trouser Press, in an ambiguous review, described the album as "shockingly low-key."

Track listing
 "Zerstörte Zelle" ("Destroyed Cell") – 8:02
 "Morning Dew" – 4:56 
 "Ich bin's" ("It's Me") – 3:24
 "MoDiMiDoFrSaSo" ("MonTueWedThuFriSatSun") – 4:51
 "12 Städte" ("12 Cities") – 8:38
 "Keine Schönheit (ohne Gefahr)" ("No Beauty Without Danger") – 5:10
 "Kein Bestandteil sein" ("Not Being Part of It") – 6:43
 "Adler kommt später" ("Eagle Comes Later") – 5:42*

Track 8 is a bonus track only available on the remastered re-release on Potomak/Indigo and is an early version of "Zerstörte Zelle".

Personnel
Einstürzende Neubauten
 Blixa Bargeld – lead vocals, guitars
 Mark Chung – bass, vocals
 Alexander Hacke – guitar, vocals
 N.U. Unruh – percussion, vocals
 F.M. Einheit – percussion, vocals

References

Einstürzende Neubauten albums
1987 albums
Albums produced by Gareth Jones (music producer)
Some Bizzare Records albums